Dianne Stewart (born March 4, 1952) is a South African author who has published over 40 books for adults and for children. She writes in English, and her books have been translated both into African languages, including Xhosa, Zulu, Sotho, and Afrikaans, and European languages, including French, Spanish, and Swedish.

Stewart's African folklore books include Daughter of the Moonlight and Other African Tales (1997), The Zebra's Stripes and Other African Animal Tales (2004), African Myths and Legends (2014), Folktales From Africa (2015), and The Guineafowl's Spots and Other African Bird Tales (2018). She has also published a book of African proverbs entitled Wisdom from Africa (2013), a book dedicated to Anthony Davey, her isiXhosa professor at Rhodes University. These folklore publications have made Stewart a "household name" in the publishing of African folktales for English-speaking South African audiences.

Stewart's book The Gift of the Sun: A Tale from South Africa (1996), with illustrations by Jude Daly, won the Smithsonian Notable Books for Children award in 1996.

Stewart graduated from Rhodes University in 1973 with degrees in Psychology and isiXhosa, and she later taught isiXhosa; Stewart's mother is a fluent Xhosa speaker. For her M.A. degree in African Languages at the University of Natal, Stewart studied the Zulu and Xhosa work-songs of rural woman on sugar-cane farms on the KwaZulu-Natal coast. Stewart also has an M.A. in creative writing from the University of Cape Town.

Stewart resides in Ballito, South Africa, and she grew up in the Eastern Cape.

References

External links
 Folktales from Africa by Dianne Stewart and illustrated by Marjorie van Heerden at Internet Archive
 The Dove by Dianne Stewart and illustrated by Jude Daly at Internet Archive
 The Gift of the Sun: A Tale from South Africa by Dianne Stewart and illustrated by Jude Daly at Internet Archive
 Dianne Stewart on writing Nuances in TimesLIVE

1952 births
Living people
20th-century South African writers
21st-century South African writers
20th-century South African women writers
21st-century South African women writers
Rhodes University alumni
University of Natal alumni
University of Cape Town alumni
Folklore writers